Paul David Pester (born 14 January 1964) is a British banker. He was chief executive officer (CEO) of TSB Bank from 2013 to 2018.

Early life
Pester grew up in Plymouth. He was educated at Tamar High School, Plymouth. He has a first class honours degree in physics from the University of Manchester, and a doctorate (DPhil) in mathematical physics from Brasenose College, University of Oxford in 1988.

Career
Pester was employed by McKinsey & Co as a management consultant, before running Virgin Money, and then working in various senior roles for Lloyds TSB, Santander and Lloyds Banking Group.

TSB
Pester was appointed in 2013 to launch TSB for the Lloyds Banking Group and, in June 2014, the BBC reported that he could earn more than £1.6 million that year in pay and bonuses. He stepped down after a disastrous IT failure at the bank, which he claimed ultimate responsibility for. On stepping down, Pester took a substantial bonus - which raised eyebrows among TSB's customers, staff and regulators. This was eventually found to be a ‘contractual severance pay agreement’ .

Personal life
Pester lives in London with his second wife. He divorced in 2015 and remarried in 2017.

References

1964 births
Alumni of Brasenose College, Oxford
Alumni of the University of Manchester
British bankers
British chief executives
British corporate directors
Living people
Businesspeople from Plymouth, Devon